Rina Balaj (born 27 January 1999), known mononymously as Rina, is a Kosovo-Albanian rapper and singer.

Life and career

1999–2019: Early life and career beginnings 

Rina Balaj was born on 27 January 1999 into an Albanian family in the city of Peja and raised in Istok, then part of the FR Yugoslavia, present Kosovo. At age 16, Balaj unsuccessfully auditioned for the fourth season of X Factor Albania in 2015. In December 2017, she was featured on Albanian singer Endri's single "Janari" and reached number 6 in Albania. Eventually signed by OnRecords, her debut single "Për ty" followed afterwards in March 2018. In September 2018, Balaj released her breakthrough single "Gigi" in collaboration with Greek-Albanian rapper Sin Boy. The single initially attained success in Albania, peaking at number 8, and later became acclaimed in neighbouring Greece, reaching the top 3.

2020–present: Mama and Balerina 

In May 2020, Balaj released her first collaborative album, MM, with Sin Boy featuring songs written in Albanian, Greek and English. Four subsequent singles, "Meredith", "Tentacion", "GG" and "Sari" were released from the collaborative album. "Meredith" peaked at number 86 in Greece, while "Tentacion" reached the top five peaking at number four. "Sari" also experienced commercial success and reached number 32 in Albania and 52 in Greece, respectively. In June 2020, her follow-up single, "Fallin In Love", went on to reach number 33 in Greece. Later that year in December 2020, her single "Zjarr" in collaboration with Sin Boy reached number 35 in her native country.

Artistry 

Balaj's music style has generally been regarded as trap although her music also includes various styles of musical genres such as R&B and hip hop. She has cited American rapper Post Malone as her favourite artist. Music critics compared her music and appearance to that of American rapper Cardi B. MM, the collaborative studio album with Sin Boy, was praised for recreating pop music and also adapting to different styles including reggaeton, disco and house.

Personal life 

In 2019, Balaj began a romantic relationship with Greek-Albanian rapper Sin Boy.

Discography

Albums 
 MM (2020)
 Balerina (2021)

Singles

As lead artist

2010s

2020s

As featured artist

References 

 

1999 births
21st-century Albanian rappers
21st-century Albanian women singers
Albanian women rappers
Albanian songwriters
Kosovan women singers
Kosovo Albanians
Living people
People from Peja
Trap musicians
Universal Music Group artists
21st-century women rappers